Attention deficit hyperactivity disorder (ADHD) is a neurodevelopmental disorder characterised by excessive amounts of inattention, hyperactivity, and impulsivity that are pervasive, impairing in multiple contexts, and otherwise age-inappropriate.

ADHD symptoms arise from executive dysfunction, and emotional dysregulation is often considered a core symptom. In children, problems paying attention may result in poor school performance. ADHD is associated with other neurodevelopmental and mental disorders as well as some non-psychiatric disorders, which can cause additional impairment, especially in modern society. Although people with ADHD struggle to focus on tasks they are not particularly interested in completing, they are often able to maintain an unusually prolonged and intense level of attention for tasks they do find interesting or rewarding; this is known as hyperfocus.

The precise causes of ADHD are unknown in the majority of cases. Genetic factors play an important role; ADHD tends to run in families and has a heritability rate of 74%. Toxins and infections during pregnancy as well as brain damage may be environmental risks.

It affects about 5–7% of children when diagnosed via the DSM-IV criteria, and 1–2% when diagnosed via the ICD-10 criteria. Rates are similar between countries and differences in rates depend mostly on how it is diagnosed. ADHD is diagnosed approximately twice as often in boys than in girls, and 1.6 times more often in men than in women, although the disorder is overlooked in girls or diagnosed in later life because their symptoms sometimes differ from diagnostic criteria. About 30–50% of people diagnosed in childhood continue to have ADHD in adulthood, with 2.58% of adults estimated to have ADHD which began in childhood. In adults, hyperactivity is usually replaced by inner restlessness, and adults often develop coping skills to compensate for their impairments. The condition can be difficult to tell apart from other conditions, as well as from high levels of activity within the range of normal behaviour. ADHD has a negative impact on patient health-related quality of life that may be further exacerbated by, or may increase the risk of, other psychiatric conditions such as anxiety and depression.

ADHD management recommendations vary and usually involve some combination of medications, counseling, and lifestyle changes. The British guideline emphasises environmental modifications and education about ADHD for individuals and carers as the first response. If symptoms persist, parent-training, medication, or psychotherapy (especially cognitive behavioural therapy) can be recommended based on age. Canadian and American guidelines recommend medications and behavioural therapy together, except in preschool-aged children for whom the first-line treatment is behavioural therapy alone. Stimulant medications are the most effective pharmaceutical treatment, although there may be side effects and any improvements will be reverted if medication is ceased.

ADHD, its diagnosis, and its treatment have been considered controversial since the 1970s. These controversies have involved doctors, teachers, policymakers, parents, and the media. Topics have included causes of ADHD and the use of stimulant medications in its treatment. ADHD is now a well-validated clinical diagnosis in children and adults, and the debate in the scientific community mainly centers on how it is diagnosed and treated. ADHD was officially known as attention deficit disorder (ADD) from 1980 to 1987; prior to the 1980s, it was known as hyperkinetic reaction of childhood. Symptoms similar to those of ADHD have been described in medical literature dating back to the 18th century.

Signs and symptoms

Inattention, hyperactivity (restlessness in adults), disruptive behaviour, and impulsivity are common in ADHD. Academic difficulties are frequent as are problems with relationships. The symptoms can be difficult to define, as it is hard to draw a line at where normal levels of inattention, hyperactivity, and impulsivity end and significant levels requiring interventions begin.

According to the fifth edition of the Diagnostic and Statistical Manual of Mental Disorders (DSM-5) and its text revision (DSM-5-TR), symptoms must be present for six months or more to a degree that is much greater than others of the same age. This requires at least six symptoms of either inattention or hyperactivity/impulsivity for those under 17 and at least five symptoms for those 17 years or older. The symptoms must be present in at least two settings (e.g., social, school, work, or home), and must directly interfere with or reduce quality of functioning. Additionally, several symptoms must have been present before age twelve.

Subtypes 

ADHD is divided into three primary presentations:
 predominantly inattentive (ADHD-PI or ADHD-I)
 predominantly hyperactive-impulsive (ADHD-PH or ADHD-HI)
 combined type (ADHD-C).

The table "Symptoms" lists the symptoms for ADHD-I and ADHD-HI from two major classification systems. Symptoms which can be better explained by another psychiatric or medical condition which an individual has are not considered to be a symptom of ADHD for that person.

Girls and women with ADHD tend to display fewer hyperactivity and impulsivity symptoms but more symptoms of inattention and distractibility.

Symptoms are expressed differently and more subtly as the individual ages. Hyperactivity tends to become less overt with age and turns into inner restlessness, difficulty relaxing or remaining still, talkativeness or constant mental activity in teens and adults with ADHD. Impulsivity in adulthood may appear as thoughtless behaviour, impatience, irresponsible spending and sensation-seeking behaviours, while inattention may appear as becoming easily bored, difficulty with organization, remaining on task and making decisions, and sensitivity to stress.

Although not listed as an official symptom for this condition, emotional dysregulation or mood lability is generally understood to be a common symptom of ADHD. People with ADHD of all ages are more likely to have problems with social skills, such as social interaction and forming and maintaining friendships. This is true for all presentations. About half of children and adolescents with ADHD experience social rejection by their peers compared to 10–15% of non-ADHD children and adolescents. People with attention deficits are prone to having difficulty processing verbal and nonverbal language which can negatively affect social interaction. They also may drift off during conversations, miss social cues, and have trouble learning social skills.

Difficulties managing anger are more common in children with ADHD as are delays in speech, language and motor development. Poorer handwriting is more common in children with ADHD. Poor handwriting in many situations can be a side effect of ADHD in itself due to decreased attentiveness but when it's a constant problem it may also be in part due to both Dyslexic and Dysgraphic individuals having higher rates of ADHD than the general population, with 3 in 10 people who have dyslexia also having ADHD. Although it causes significant difficulty, many children with ADHD have an attention span equal to or greater than that of other children for tasks and subjects they find interesting.

Comorbidities

Psychiatric
In children, ADHD occurs with other disorders about two-thirds of the time.

Other neurodevelopmental conditions are common comorbidities. Autism spectrum disorder (ASD), co-occurring at a rate of 21% in those with ADHD, affects social skills, ability to communicate, behaviour, and interests. Both ADHD and ASD can be diagnosed in the same person. Learning disabilities have been found to occur in about 20–30% of children with ADHD. Learning disabilities can include developmental speech and language disorders, and academic skills disorders. ADHD, however, is not considered a learning disability, but it very frequently causes academic difficulties. Intellectual disabilities and Tourette's syndrome are also common.

ADHD is often comorbid with disruptive, impulse control, and conduct disorders. Oppositional defiant disorder (ODD) occurs in about 25% of children with an inattentive presentation and 50% of those with a combined presentation. It is characterised by angry or irritable mood, argumentative or defiant behaviour and vindictiveness which are age-inappropriate. Conduct disorder (CD) occurs in about 25% of adolescents with ADHD. It is characterised by aggression, destruction of property, deceitfulness, theft and violations of rules. Adolescents with ADHD who also have CD are more likely to develop antisocial personality disorder in adulthood. Brain imaging supports that CD and ADHD are separate conditions, wherein conduct disorder was shown to reduce the size of one's temporal lobe and limbic system, and increase the size of one's orbitofrontal cortex, whereas ADHD was shown to reduce connections in the cerebellum and prefrontal cortex more broadly. Conduct disorder involves more impairment in motivation control than ADHD. Intermittent explosive disorder is characterised by sudden and disproportionate outbursts of anger and co-occurs in individuals with ADHD more frequently than in the general population.

Anxiety and mood disorders are frequent comorbidities. Anxiety disorders have been found to occur more commonly in the ADHD population, as have mood disorders (especially bipolar disorder and major depressive disorder). Boys diagnosed with the combined ADHD subtype are more likely to have a mood disorder. Adults and children with ADHD sometimes also have bipolar disorder, which requires careful assessment to accurately diagnose and treat both conditions.

Sleep disorders and ADHD commonly co-exist. They can also occur as a side effect of medications used to treat ADHD. In children with ADHD, insomnia is the most common sleep disorder with behavioural therapy being the preferred treatment. Problems with sleep initiation are common among individuals with ADHD but often they will be deep sleepers and have significant difficulty getting up in the morning. Melatonin is sometimes used in children who have sleep onset insomnia. Specifically, the sleep disorder restless legs syndrome has been found to be more common in those with ADHD and is often due to iron deficiency anemia. However, restless legs can simply be a part of ADHD and requires careful assessment to differentiate between the two disorders. Delayed sleep phase disorder is also a common comorbidity of those with ADHD.

There are other psychiatric conditions which are often co-morbid with ADHD, such as substance use disorders. Individuals with ADHD are at increased risk of substance abuse. This is most commonly seen with alcohol or cannabis. The reason for this may be an altered reward pathway in the brains of ADHD individuals, self-treatment and increased psychosocial risk factors. This makes the evaluation and treatment of ADHD more difficult, with serious substance misuse problems usually treated first due to their greater risks. Other psychiatric conditions include reactive attachment disorder, characterised by a severe inability to appropriately relate socially, and sluggish cognitive tempo, a cluster of symptoms that potentially comprises another attention disorder and may occur in 30–50% of ADHD cases, regardless of the subtype. Individuals with ADHD are three times more likely to develop and be diagnosed with an eating disorder compared to those without ADHD; conversely, individuals with eating disorders are two times more likely to have ADHD than those without eating disorders.

Trauma
ADHD, trauma, and Adverse Childhood Experiences are also comorbid, which could in part be potentially explained by the similarity in presentation between different diagnoses. The symptoms of ADHD and PTSD can have significant behavioural overlap—in particular, motor restlessness, difficulty concentrating, distractibility, irritability/anger, emotional constriction or dysregulation, poor impulse control, and forgetfulness are common in both. This could result in trauma-related disorders or ADHD being mis-identified as the other. Additionally, traumatic events in childhood are a risk factor for ADHD - it can lead to structural brain changes and the development of ADHD behaviours. Finally, the behavioural consequences of ADHD symptoms cause a higher chance of the individual experiencing trauma (and therefore ADHD leads to a concrete diagnosis of a trauma-related disorder).

Non-psychiatric
Some non-psychiatric conditions are also comorbidities of ADHD. This includes epilepsy, a neurological condition characterised by recurrent seizures. There are well established associations between ADHD and obesity, asthma and sleep disorders, and an association with celiac disease. Children with ADHD have a higher risk for migraine headaches, but have no increased risk of tension-type headaches. In addition, children with ADHD may also experience headaches as a result of medication.

A 2021 review reported that several neurometabolic disorders caused by inborn errors of metabolism converge on common neurochemical mechanisms that interfere with biological mechanisms also considered central in ADHD pathophysiology and treatment. This highlights the importance of close collaboration between health services to avoid clinical overshadowing.

Suicide risk
Systematic reviews conducted in 2017 and 2020 found strong evidence that ADHD is associated with increased suicide risk across all age groups, as well as growing evidence that an ADHD diagnosis in childhood or adolescence represents a significant future suicidal risk factor. Potential causes include ADHD's association with functional impairment, negative social, educational and occupational outcomes, and financial distress. A 2019 meta-analysis indicated a significant association between ADHD and suicidal spectrum behaviours (suicidal attempts, ideations, plans, and completed suicides); across the studies examined, the prevalence of suicide attempts in individuals with ADHD was 18.9%, compared to 9.3% in individuals without ADHD, and the findings were substantially replicated among studies which adjusted for other variables. However, the relationship between ADHD and suicidal spectrum behaviours remains unclear due to mixed findings across individual studies and the complicating impact of comorbid psychiatric disorders. There is no clear data on whether there is a direct relationship between ADHD and suicidality, or whether ADHD increases suicide risk through comorbidities.

IQ test performance
Certain studies have found that people with ADHD tend to have lower scores on intelligence quotient (IQ) tests. The significance of this is controversial due to the differences between people with ADHD and the difficulty determining the influence of symptoms, such as distractibility, on lower scores rather than intellectual capacity. In studies of ADHD, higher IQs may be over-represented because many studies exclude individuals who have lower IQs despite those with ADHD scoring on average nine points lower on standardised intelligence measures. In individuals with high intelligence, there is increased risk of a missed ADHD diagnosis, possibly because of compensatory strategies in highly intelligent individuals.

Studies of adults suggest that negative differences in intelligence are not meaningful and may be explained by associated health problems.

Causes
ADHD is generally claimed to be the result of neurological dysfunction in processes associated with the production or use of dopamine and norepinephrine in various brain structures, but there are no confirmed causes. It may involve interactions between genetics and the environment.

Genetics 
ADHD has a high heritability of 74%, meaning that 74% of the presence of ADHD in the population is due to genetic factors. There are multiple gene variants which each slightly increase the likelihood of a person having ADHD; it is polygenic and arises through the combination of many gene variants which each have a small effect. The siblings of children with ADHD are three to four times more likely to develop the disorder than siblings of children without the disorder.

Arousal is related to dopaminergic functioning, and ADHD presents with low dopaminergic functioning. Typically, a number of genes are involved, many of which directly affect dopamine neurotransmission. Those involved with dopamine include DAT, DRD4, DRD5, TAAR1, MAOA, COMT, and DBH. Other genes associated with ADHD include SERT, HTR1B, SNAP25, GRIN2A, ADRA2A, TPH2, and BDNF. A common variant of a gene called latrophilin 3 is estimated to be responsible for about 9% of cases and when this variant is present, people are particularly responsive to stimulant medication. The 7 repeat variant of dopamine receptor D4 (DRD4–7R) causes increased inhibitory effects induced by dopamine and is associated with ADHD. The DRD4 receptor is a G protein-coupled receptor that inhibits adenylyl cyclase. The DRD4–7R mutation results in a wide range of behavioural phenotypes, including ADHD symptoms reflecting split attention. The DRD4 gene is both linked to novelty seeking and ADHD. The genes GFOD1 and CDH13 show strong genetic associations with ADHD. CHD13's association with ASD, schizophrenia, bipolar disorder, and depression make it an interesting candidate causative gene. Another candidate causative gene that has been identified is ADGRL3. In zebrafish, knockout of this gene causes a loss of dopaminergic function in the ventral diencephalon and the fish display a hyperactive/impulsive phenotype.

For genetic variation to be used as a tool for diagnosis, more validating studies need to be performed. However, smaller studies have shown that genetic polymorphisms in genes related to catecholaminergic neurotransmission or the SNARE complex of the synapse can reliably predict a person's response to stimulant medication. Rare genetic variants show more relevant clinical significance as their penetrance (the chance of developing the disorder) tends to be much higher. However their usefulness as tools for diagnosis is limited as no single gene predicts ADHD. ASD shows genetic overlap with ADHD at both common and rare levels of genetic variation.

Environment 
In addition to genetics, some environmental factors might play a role in causing ADHD. Alcohol intake during pregnancy can cause fetal alcohol spectrum disorders which can include ADHD or symptoms like it. Children exposed to certain toxic substances, such as lead or polychlorinated biphenyls, may develop problems which resemble ADHD. Exposure to the organophosphate insecticides chlorpyrifos and dialkyl phosphate is associated with an increased risk; however, the evidence is not conclusive. Exposure to tobacco smoke during pregnancy can cause problems with central nervous system development and can increase the risk of ADHD. Nicotine exposure during pregnancy may be an environmental risk.

Extreme premature birth, very low birth weight, and extreme neglect, abuse, or social deprivation also increase the risk as do certain infections during pregnancy, at birth, and in early childhood. These infections include, among others, various viruses (measles, varicella zoster encephalitis, rubella, enterovirus 71). At least 30% of children with a traumatic brain injury later develop ADHD and about 5% of cases are due to brain damage.

Some studies suggest that in a small number of children, artificial food dyes or preservatives may be associated with an increased prevalence of ADHD or ADHD-like symptoms, but the evidence is weak and may only apply to children with food sensitivities. The European Union has put in place regulatory measures based on these concerns. In a minority of children, intolerances or allergies to certain foods may worsen ADHD symptoms.

Individuals with hypokalemic sensory overstimulation are sometimes diagnosed as having attention deficit hyperactivity disorder (ADHD), raising the possibility that a subtype of ADHD has a cause that can be understood mechanistically and treated in a novel way. The sensory overload is treatable with oral potassium gluconate.

Research does not support popular beliefs that ADHD is caused by eating too much refined sugar, watching too much television, parenting, poverty or family chaos; however, they might worsen ADHD symptoms in certain people.

Society 
The youngest children in a class have been found to be more likely to be diagnosed as having ADHD, possibly due to them being developmentally behind their older classmates. They also appear to use ADHD medications at nearly twice the rate of their peers.

In some cases, an inappropriate diagnosis of ADHD may reflect a dysfunctional family or a poor educational system, rather than any true presence of ADHD in the individual. In other cases, it may be explained by increasing academic expectations, with a diagnosis being a method for parents in some countries to get extra financial and educational support for their child. Behaviours typical of ADHD occur more commonly in children who have experienced violence and emotional abuse.

Pathophysiology 
Current models of ADHD suggest that it is associated with functional impairments in some of the brain's neurotransmitter systems, particularly those involving dopamine and norepinephrine. The dopamine and norepinephrine pathways that originate in the ventral tegmental area and locus coeruleus project to diverse regions of the brain and govern a variety of cognitive processes. The dopamine pathways and norepinephrine pathways which project to the prefrontal cortex and striatum are directly responsible for modulating executive function (cognitive control of behaviour), motivation, reward perception, and motor function; these pathways are known to play a central role in the pathophysiology of ADHD. Larger models of ADHD with additional pathways have been proposed.

Brain structure 

In children with ADHD, there is a general reduction of volume in certain brain structures, with a proportionally greater decrease in the volume in the left-sided prefrontal cortex. The posterior parietal cortex also shows thinning in individuals with ADHD compared to controls. Other brain structures in the prefrontal-striatal-cerebellar and prefrontal-striatal-thalamic circuits have also been found to differ between people with and without ADHD.

The subcortical volumes of the accumbens, amygdala, caudate, hippocampus, and putamen appears smaller in individuals with ADHD compared with controls. Structural MRI studies have also revealed differences in white matter, with marked differences in inter-hemispheric asymmetry between ADHD and typically developing youths.

Function MRI (fMRI) studies have revealed a number of differences between ADHD and control brains. Mirroring what is known from structural findings, fMRI studies have showed evidence for a higher connectivity between subcortical and cortical regions, such as between the caudate and prefrontal cortex. The degree of hyperconnectivity between these regions correlated with the severity of inattention or hyperactivity  Hemispheric lateralization processes have also been postulated as being implicated in ADHD, but empiric results showed contrasting evidence on the topic.

Neurotransmitter pathways 
Previously, it had been suggested that the elevated number of dopamine transporters in people with ADHD was part of the pathophysiology, but it appears the elevated numbers may be due to adaptation following exposure to stimulant medication. Current models involve the mesocorticolimbic dopamine pathway and the locus coeruleus-noradrenergic system. ADHD psychostimulants possess treatment efficacy because they increase neurotransmitter activity in these systems. There may additionally be abnormalities in serotonergic, glutamatergic, or cholinergic pathways.

Executive function and motivation 
The symptoms of ADHD arise from a deficiency in certain executive functions (e.g., attentional control, inhibitory control, and working memory). Executive functions are a set of cognitive processes that are required to successfully select and monitor behaviours that facilitate the attainment of one's chosen goals. The executive function impairments that occur in ADHD individuals result in problems with staying organised, time keeping, excessive procrastination, maintaining concentration, paying attention, ignoring distractions, regulating emotions, and remembering details. People with ADHD appear to have unimpaired long-term memory, and deficits in long-term recall appear to be attributed to impairments in working memory. Due to the rates of brain maturation and the increasing demands for executive control as a person gets older, ADHD impairments may not fully manifest themselves until adolescence or even early adulthood. Conversely, brain maturation trajectories, potentially exhibiting diverging longitudinal trends in ADHD, may support a later improvement in executive functions after reaching adulthood.

ADHD has also been associated with motivational deficits in children. Children with ADHD often find it difficult to focus on long-term over short-term rewards, and exhibit impulsive behaviour for short-term rewards.

Paradoxical reaction to neuroactive substances 
Another sign of the structurally altered signal processing in the central nervous system in this group of people is the conspicuously common Paradoxical reaction ( of patients). These are unexpected reactions in the opposite direction as with a normal effect, or otherwise significant different reactions. These are reactions to neuroactive substances such as local anesthetic at the dentist, sedative, caffeine, antihistamine, weak neuroleptics and central and peripheral painkillers. Since the causes of paradoxical reactions are at least partly genetic, it may be useful in critical situations, for example before operations, to ask whether such abnormalities may also exist in family members.

Diagnosis
ADHD is diagnosed by an assessment of a person's behavioural and mental development, including ruling out the effects of drugs, medications, and other medical or psychiatric problems as explanations for the symptoms. ADHD diagnosis often takes into account feedback from parents and teachers with most diagnoses begun after a teacher raises concerns. It may be viewed as the extreme end of one or more continuous human traits found in all people. Imaging studies of the brain do not give consistent results between individuals; thus, they are only used for research purposes and not a diagnosis.

In North America and Australia, DSM-5 criteria are used for diagnosis, while European countries usually use the ICD-10. The DSM-IV criteria for diagnosis of ADHD is  more likely to diagnose ADHD than is the ICD-10 criteria. ADHD is alternately classified as neurodevelopmental disorder or a disruptive behaviour disorder along with ODD, CD, and antisocial personality disorder. A diagnosis does not imply a neurological disorder.

Associated conditions that should be screened for include anxiety, depression, ODD, CD, and learning and language disorders. Other conditions that should be considered are other neurodevelopmental disorders, tics, and sleep apnea.

Self-rating scales, such as the ADHD rating scale and the Vanderbilt ADHD diagnostic rating scale, are used in the screening and evaluation of ADHD. Electroencephalography is not accurate enough to make an ADHD diagnosis.

Classification

Diagnostic and Statistical Manual
As with many other psychiatric disorders, a formal diagnosis should be made by a qualified professional based on a set number of criteria. In the United States, these criteria are defined by the American Psychiatric Association in the DSM. Based on the DSM-5 criteria published in 2013 and the DSM-5-TR criteria published in 2022, there are three presentations of ADHD:

 ADHD, predominantly inattentive type, presents with symptoms including being easily distracted, forgetful, daydreaming, disorganization, poor concentration, and difficulty completing tasks.
 ADHD, predominantly hyperactive-impulsive type, presents with excessive fidgeting and restlessness, hyperactivity, and difficulty waiting and remaining seated.
 ADHD, combined type, is a combination of the first two presentations.

This subdivision is based on presence of at least six (in children) or five (in older teenagers and adults) out of nine long-term (lasting at least six months) symptoms of inattention, hyperactivity–impulsivity, or both. To be considered, several symptoms must have appeared by the age of six to twelve and occur in more than one environment (e.g. at home and at school or work). The symptoms must be inappropriate for a child of that age and there must be clear evidence that they are causing social, school or work related problems.

The DSM-5 and the DSM-5-TR also provide two diagnoses for individuals who have symptoms of ADHD but do not entirely meet the requirements. Other Specified ADHD allows the clinician to describe why the individual does not meet the criteria, whereas Unspecified ADHD is used where the clinician chooses not to describe the reason.

International Classification of Diseases
In the eleventh revision of the International Statistical Classification of Diseases and Related Health Problems (ICD-11) by the World Health Organization, the disorder is classified as Attention deficit hyperactivity disorder (with the code 6A05). The defined subtypes are similar to those of the DSM-5: predominantly inattentive presentation (6A05.0); predominantly hyperactive-impulsive presentation(6A05.1); combined presentation (6A05.2). However, the ICD-11 includes two residual categories for individuals who do not entirely match any of the defined subtypes: other specified presentation (6A05.Y) where the clinician includes detail on the individual's presentation; and presentation unspecified (6A05.Z) where the clinician does not provide detail.

In the tenth revision (ICD-10), the symptoms of hyperkinetic disorder were analogous to ADHD in the ICD-11. When a conduct disorder  (as defined by ICD-10) is present, the condition was referred to as hyperkinetic conduct disorder. Otherwise, the disorder was classified as disturbance of activity and attention, other hyperkinetic disorders or hyperkinetic disorders, unspecified. The latter was sometimes referred to as hyperkinetic syndrome.

Social construct theory
The social construct theory of ADHD suggests that, because the boundaries between normal and abnormal behaviour are socially constructed (i.e. jointly created and validated by all members of society, and in particular by physicians, parents, teachers, and others), it then follows that subjective valuations and judgements determine which diagnostic criteria are used and thus, the number of people affected. This difference means using DSM-IV criteria could diagnose ADHD at rates three to four times higher than ICD-10 criteria. Thomas Szasz, a supporter of this theory, has argued that ADHD was "invented and then given a name".

Adults

Adults with ADHD are diagnosed under the same criteria, including that their signs must have been present by the age of six to twelve. The individual is the best source for information in diagnosis, however others may provide useful information about the individual's symptoms currently and in childhood; a family history of ADHD also adds weight to a diagnosis. While the core symptoms of ADHD are similar in children and adults, they often present differently in adults than in children: for example, excessive physical activity seen in children may present as feelings of restlessness and constant mental activity in adults.

Worldwide, it is estimated that 2.58% of adults have persistent ADHD (where the individual currently meets the criteria and there is evidence of childhood onset), and 6.76% of adults have symptomatic ADHD (meaning that they currently meet the criteria for ADHD, regardless of childhood onset). In 2020, this was 139.84 million and 366.33 million affected adults respectively. Around 15% of children with ADHD continue to meet full DSM-IV-TR criteria at 25 years of age, and 50% still experience some symptoms. , most adults remain untreated. Many adults with ADHD without diagnosis and treatment have a disorganised life, and some use non-prescribed drugs or alcohol as a coping mechanism. Other problems may include relationship and job difficulties, and an increased risk of criminal activities. Associated mental health problems include depression, anxiety disorders, and learning disabilities.

Some ADHD symptoms in adults differ from those seen in children. While children with ADHD may climb and run about excessively, adults may experience an inability to relax, or may talk excessively in social situations. Adults with ADHD may start relationships impulsively, display sensation-seeking behaviour, and be short-tempered. Addictive behaviour such as substance abuse and gambling are common. This led to those who presented differently as they aged having outgrown the DSM-IV criteria. The DSM-5 criteria does specifically deal with adults unlike that of DSM-IV, which does not fully take into account the differences in impairments seen in adulthood compared to childhood.

For diagnosis in an adult, having symptoms since childhood is required. Nevertheless, a proportion of adults who meet the criteria for ADHD in adulthood would not have been diagnosed with ADHD as children. Most cases of late-onset ADHD develop the disorder between the ages of 12-16 and may therefore be considered early adult or adolescent-onset ADHD.

Differential diagnosis

The DSM provides potential differential diagnoses - potential alternate explanations for specific symptoms. Assessment and investigation of clinical history determines which is the most appropriate diagnosis. The DSM-5 suggests ODD, intermittent explosive disorder, and other neurodevelopmental disorders (such as stereotypic movement disorder and Tourette's disorder), in addition to specific learning disorder, intellectual developmental disorder, ASD, reactive attachment disorder, anxiety disorders, depressive disorders, bipolar disorder, disruptive mood dysregulation disorder, substance use disorder, personality disorders, psychotic disorders, medication-induced symptoms, and neurocognitive disorders. Many but not all of these are also common comorbidities of ADHD. The DSM-5-TR also suggests post-traumatic stress disorder.

Symptoms of ADHD, such as low mood and poor self-image, mood swings, and irritability, can be confused with dysthymia, cyclothymia or bipolar disorder as well as with borderline personality disorder. Some symptoms that are due to anxiety disorders, personality disorder, developmental disabilities or intellectual disability or the effects of substance abuse such as intoxication and withdrawal can overlap with ADHD. These disorders can also sometimes occur along with ADHD. Medical conditions which can cause ADHD-type symptoms include: hyperthyroidism, seizure disorder, lead toxicity, hearing deficits, hepatic disease, sleep apnea, drug interactions, untreated celiac disease, and head injury.

Primary sleep disorders may affect attention and behaviour and the symptoms of ADHD may affect sleep. It is thus recommended that children with ADHD be regularly assessed for sleep problems. Sleepiness in children may result in symptoms ranging from the classic ones of yawning and rubbing the eyes, to hyperactivity and inattentiveness. Obstructive sleep apnea can also cause ADHD-type symptoms.

Management

The management of ADHD typically involves counseling or medications, either alone or in combination. While treatment may improve long-term outcomes, it does not get rid of negative outcomes entirely. Medications used include stimulants, atomoxetine, alpha-2 adrenergic receptor agonists, and sometimes antidepressants. In those who have trouble focusing on long-term rewards, a large amount of positive reinforcement improves task performance. ADHD stimulants also improve persistence and task performance in children with ADHD. "Recent evidence from observational and registry studies indicates that pharmacological treatment of ADHD is associated with increased achievement and decreased absenteeism at school, a reduced risk of trauma-related emergency hospital visits, reduced risks of suicide and attempted suicide, and decreased rates of substance abuse and criminality".

Behavioural therapies
There is good evidence for the use of behavioural therapies in ADHD. They are the recommended first-line treatment in those who have mild symptoms or who are preschool-aged. Psychological therapies used include: psychoeducational input, behavior therapy, cognitive behavioral therapy, interpersonal psychotherapy, family therapy, school-based interventions, social skills training, behavioural peer intervention, organization training, and parent management training. Neurofeedback has greater treatment effects than non-active controls for up to 6 months and possibly a year following treatment, and may have treatment effects comparable to active controls (controls proven to have a clinical effect) over that time period. Despite efficacy in research, there is insufficient regulation of neurofeedback practice, leading to ineffective applications and false claims regarding innovations. Parent training may improve a number of behavioural problems including oppositional and non-compliant behaviours.

There is little high-quality research on the effectiveness of family therapy for ADHD—but the existing evidence shows that it is similar to community care, and better than placebo. ADHD-specific support groups can provide information and may help families cope with ADHD.

Social skills training, behavioural modification, and medication may have some limited beneficial effects in peer relationships. Stable, high-quality friendships with non-deviant peers protect against later psychological problems.

Medication

Stimulants
Methylphenidate and amphetamine or its derivatives are first-line treatments for ADHD as they are considered the most effective pharmaceutical treatments. About 70 percent respond to the first stimulant tried and as few as 10 percent respond to neither amphetamines nor methylphenidate. Stimulants may also reduce the risk of unintentional injuries in children with ADHD. Magnetic resonance imaging studies suggest that long-term treatment with amphetamine or methylphenidate decreases abnormalities in brain structure and function found in subjects with ADHD. A 2018 review found the greatest short-term benefit with methylphenidate in children, and amphetamines in adults.

The likelihood of developing insomnia for ADHD patients taking stimulants has been measured at between 11 and 45 percent for different medications, and may be a main reason for discontinuation. Other side effects, such as tics, decreased appetite and weight loss, or emotional lability, may also lead to discontinuation. Stimulant psychosis and mania are rare at therapeutic doses, appearing to occur in approximately 0.1% of individuals, within the first several weeks after starting amphetamine therapy. The safety of these medications in pregnancy is unclear. Symptom improvement is not sustained if medication is ceased.

The long-term effects of ADHD medication have yet to be fully determined, although stimulants are generally beneficial and safe for up to two years for children and adolescents. 
Regular monitoring has been recommended in those on long-term treatment. There are indications suggesting that stimulant therapy for children and adolescents should be stopped periodically to assess continuing need for medication, decrease possible growth delay, and reduce tolerance. Although potentially addictive at high doses, stimulants used to treat ADHD have low potential for abuse. Treatment with stimulants is either protective against substance abuse or has no effect.

The majority of studies on nicotine and other nicotinic agonists as treatments for ADHD have shown favorable results; however, no nicotinic drug has been approved for ADHD treatment. Caffeine was formerly used as a second-line treatment for ADHD. It is considered less effective than methylphenidate or amphetamine but more so than placebo for children with ADHD. Pseudoephedrine and ephedrine do not affect ADHD symptoms.

Modafinil has shown some efficacy in reducing the severity of ADHD in children and adolescents. It may be prescribed off-label to treat ADHD.

Non-stimulants
There are a number of non-stimulant medications, such as Viloxazine, atomoxetine, bupropion, guanfacine, amantadine (effective in children and adolescents but still not been seen for adults), and clonidine, that may be used as alternatives, or added to stimulant therapy. There are no good studies comparing the various medications; however, they appear more or less equal with respect to side effects. For children, stimulants appear to improve academic performance while atomoxetine does not.

Atomoxetine, due to its lack of addiction liability, may be preferred in those who are at risk of recreational or compulsive stimulant use, although evidence is lacking to support its use over stimulants for this reason. Evidence supports its ability to improve symptoms when compared to placebo.

Amantadine was shown to induce similar improvements in children treated methylphenidate, with less frequent side effects. A 2021 retrospective study showed showed that amantadine may serve as an effective adjunct to stimulants for ADHD–related symptoms and appears to be a safer alternative to second- or third-generation antipsychotics.

There is little evidence on the effects of medication on social behaviours. Antipsychotics may also be used to treat aggression in ADHD.

Guidelines
Guidelines on when to use medications vary by country. The United Kingdom's National Institute for Health and Care Excellence recommends use for children only in severe cases, though for adults medication is a first-line treatment. Conversely, most United States guidelines recommend medications in most age groups. Medications are especially not recommended for preschool children. Underdosing of stimulants can occur, and can result in a lack of response or later loss of effectiveness. This is particularly common in adolescents and adults as approved dosing is based on school-aged children, causing some practitioners to use weight-based or benefit-based off-label dosing instead.

Exercise 
Regular physical exercise, particularly aerobic exercise, is an effective add-on treatment for ADHD in children and adults, particularly when combined with stimulant medication (although the best intensity and type of aerobic exercise for improving symptoms are not currently known). The long-term effects of regular aerobic exercise in ADHD individuals include better behaviour and motor abilities, improved executive functions (including attention, inhibitory control, and planning, among other cognitive domains), faster information processing speed, and better memory. Parent-teacher ratings of behavioural and socio-emotional outcomes in response to regular aerobic exercise include: better overall function, reduced ADHD symptoms, better self-esteem, reduced levels of anxiety and depression, fewer somatic complaints, better academic and classroom behaviour, and improved social behaviour. Exercising while on stimulant medication augments the effect of stimulant medication on executive function. It is believed that these short-term effects of exercise are mediated by an increased abundance of synaptic dopamine and norepinephrine in the brain.

Diet 
Dietary modifications are not recommended  by the American Academy of Pediatrics, the National Institute for Health and Care Excellence, or the Agency for Healthcare Research and Quality due to insufficient evidence.
A 2013 meta-analysis found less than a third of children with ADHD see some improvement in symptoms with free fatty acid supplementation or decreased eating of artificial food colouring. These benefits may be limited to children with food sensitivities or those who are simultaneously being treated with ADHD medications. This review also found that evidence does not support removing other foods from the diet to treat ADHD. A 2014 review found that an elimination diet results in a small overall benefit in a minority of children, such as those with allergies. A 2016 review stated that the use of a gluten-free diet as standard ADHD treatment is not advised. A 2017 review showed that a few-foods elimination diet may help children too young to be medicated or not responding to medication, while free fatty acid supplementation or decreased eating of artificial food colouring as standard ADHD treatment is not advised. Chronic deficiencies of iron, magnesium and iodine may have a negative impact on ADHD symptoms. There is a small amount of evidence that lower tissue zinc levels may be associated with ADHD. In the absence of a demonstrated zinc deficiency (which is rare outside of developing countries), zinc supplementation is not recommended as treatment for ADHD. However, zinc supplementation may reduce the minimum effective dose of amphetamine when it is used with amphetamine for the treatment of ADHD.

Prognosis
ADHD persists into adulthood in about 30–50% of cases. Those affected are likely to develop coping mechanisms as they mature, thus compensating to some extent for their previous symptoms. Children with ADHD have a higher risk of unintentional injuries. Effects of medication on functional impairment and quality of life (e.g. reduced risk of accidents) have been found across multiple domains. Rates of smoking among those with ADHD are higher than in the general population at about 40%.

Individuals with ADHD are significantly overrepresented in prison populations. Although there is no generally accepted estimate of ADHD prevalence among inmates, a 2015 meta-analysis estimated a prevalence of 25.5%, and a larger 2018 meta-analysis estimated the frequency to be 26.2%. ADHD is more common among longer-term inmates; a 2010 study at Norrtälje Prison, a high-security prison in Sweden, found an estimated ADHD prevalence of 40%.

Epidemiology

ADHD is estimated to affect about 6–7% of people aged 18 and under when diagnosed via the DSM-IV criteria. When diagnosed via the ICD-10 criteria, rates in this age group are estimated around 1–2%. Children in North America appear to have a higher rate of ADHD than children in Africa and the Middle East; this is believed to be due to differing methods of diagnosis rather than a difference in underlying frequency.   it was estimated to affect 84.7 million people globally. If the same diagnostic methods are used, the rates are similar between countries. ADHD is diagnosed approximately three times more often in boys than in girls. This may reflect either a true difference in underlying rate, or that women and girls with ADHD are less likely to be diagnosed.

Rates of diagnosis and treatment have increased in both the United Kingdom and the United States since the 1970s. Prior to 1970, it was rare for children to be diagnosed with ADHD, while in the 1970s rates were about 1%. This is believed to be primarily due to changes in how the condition is diagnosed and how readily people are willing to treat it with medications rather than a true change in how common the condition is. It was believed changes to the diagnostic criteria in 2013 with the release of the DSM-5 would increase the percentage of people diagnosed with ADHD, especially among adults.

Due to disparities in the treatment and understanding of ADHD between caucasian and non-caucasian populations, many non-caucasian children go undiagnosed and unmedicated. It was found that within the US that there was often a disparity between caucasian and non-caucasian understandings of ADHD. This led to a difference in the classification of the symptoms of ADHD, and therefore, its misdiagnosis. It was also found that it was common in non-caucasian families and teachers to understand the symptoms of ADHD as behavioural issues, rather than mental illness.

Crosscultural differences in diagnosis of ADHD can also be attributed to the long-lasting effects of harmful, racially targeted medical practices. Medical pseudosciences, particularly those that targeted African American populations during the period of slavery in the US, lead to a distrust of medical practices within certain communities. The combination of ADHD symptoms often being regarded as misbehaviour rather than as a psychiatric condition, and the use of drugs to regulate ADHD, result in a hesitancy to trust a diagnosis of ADHD. Cases of misdiagnosis in ADHD can also occur due to stereotyping of non-caucasian individuals. Due to ADHD's subjectively determined symptoms, medical professionals may diagnose individuals based on stereotyped behaviour or misdiagnose due to differences in symptom presentation between Caucasian and non-Caucasian individuals.

History

Hyperactivity has long been part of the human condition. Sir Alexander Crichton describes "mental restlessness" in his book An inquiry into the nature and origin of mental derangement written in 1798. He made observations about children showing signs of being inattentive and having the "fidgets". The first clear description of ADHD is credited to George Still in 1902 during a series of lectures he gave to the Royal College of Physicians of London. He noted both nature and nurture could be influencing this disorder.

Alfred Tredgold proposed an association between brain damage and behavioural or learning problems which was able to be validated by the encephalitis lethargica epidemic from 1917 through 1928.

The terminology used to describe the condition has changed over time and has included: minimal brain dysfunction in the DSM-I (1952), hyperkinetic reaction of childhood in the DSM-II (1968), and attention-deficit disorder with or without hyperactivity in the DSM-III (1980). In 1987, this was changed to ADHD in the DSM-III-R, and in 1994 the DSM-IV in split the diagnosis into three subtypes: ADHD inattentive type, ADHD hyperactive-impulsive type, and ADHD combined type. These terms were kept in the DSM-5 in 2013 and in the DSM-5-TR in 2022. Prior to the DSM, terms included minimal brain damage in the 1930s.

In 1934, Benzedrine became the first amphetamine medication approved for use in the United States. Methylphenidate was introduced in the 1950s, and enantiopure dextroamphetamine in the 1970s. The use of stimulants to treat ADHD was first described in 1937. Charles Bradley gave the children with behavioural disorders Benzedrine and found it improved academic performance and behaviour.

Once neuroimaging studies were possible, studies conducted in the 1990s provided support for the pre-existing theory that neurological differences - particularly in the frontal lobes - were involved in ADHD. During this same period, a genetic component was identified and ADHD was acknowledged to be a persistent, long-term disorder which lasted from childhood into adulthood.

ADHD was split into the current three sub-types because of a field trial completed by Lahey and colleagues.

Controversy

ADHD, its diagnosis, and its treatment have been controversial since the 1970s. The controversies involve clinicians, teachers, policymakers, parents, and the media. Positions range from the view that ADHD is within the normal range of behaviour to the hypothesis that ADHD is a genetic condition. Other areas of controversy include the use of stimulant medications in children, the method of diagnosis, and the possibility of overdiagnosis. In 2009, the National Institute for Health and Care Excellence, while acknowledging the controversy, states that the current treatments and methods of diagnosis are based on the dominant view of the academic literature. In 2014, Keith Conners, one of the early advocates for recognition of the disorder, spoke out against overdiagnosis in a New York Times article. In contrast, a 2014 peer-reviewed medical literature review indicated that ADHD is underdiagnosed in adults.

With widely differing rates of diagnosis across countries, states within countries, races, and ethnicities, some suspect factors other than the presence of the symptoms of ADHD are playing a role in diagnosis, such as cultural norms. Some sociologists consider ADHD to be an example of the medicalization of deviant behaviour, that is, the turning of the previously  issue of school performance into a medical one. Most healthcare providers accept ADHD as a genuine disorder, at least in the small number of people with severe symptoms. Among healthcare providers the debate mainly centers on diagnosis and treatment in the much greater number of people with mild symptoms.

The nature and range of desirable endpoints of ADHD treatment vary among diagnostic standards for ADHD. In most studies, the efficacy of treatment is determined by reductions in ADHD symptoms. However, some studies have included subjective ratings from teachers and parents as part of their assessment of ADHD treatment efficacies. By contrast, the subjective ratings of children undergoing ADHD treatment are seldom included in studies evaluating the efficacy of ADHD treatments.

There have been notable differences in the diagnosis patterns of birthdays in school-age children. Those born relatively younger to the school starting age than others in a classroom environment are shown to be more likely diagnosed with ADHD. Boys who were born in December in which the school age cut-off was December 31 were shown to be 30% more likely to be diagnosed and 41% to be treated than others born in January. Girls born in December had a diagnosis percentage of 70% and 77% treatment more than ones born the following month. Children who were born at the last 3 days of a calendar year were reported to have significantly higher levels of diagnosis and treatment for ADHD than children born at the first 3 days of a calendar year. The studies suggest that ADHD diagnosis is prone to subjective analysis.

Research directions

Possible positive traits 
Possible positive traits of ADHD are a new avenue of research, and therefore limited.

A 2020 review found that creativity may be associated with ADHD symptoms, particularly divergent thinking and quantity of creative achievements, but not with the disorder of ADHD itself – i.e. it has not been found to be increased in people diagnosed with the disorder, only in people with subclinical symptoms or those that possess traits associated with the disorder. Divergent thinking is the ability to produce creative solutions which differ significantly from each other and consider the issue from multiple perspectives. Those with ADHD symptoms could be advantaged in this form of creativity as they tend to have diffuse attention, allowing rapid switching between aspects of the task under consideration; flexible associative memory, allowing them to remember and use more distantly-related ideas which is associated with creativity; and impulsivity, which causes people with ADHD symptoms to consider ideas which others may not have. However, people with ADHD may struggle with convergent thinking, which is a cognitive process through which a set of obviously relevant knowledge is utilised in a focused effort to arrive at a single perceived best solution to a problem.

A 2020 article suggested that historical documentation supported Leonardo da Vinci's difficulties with procrastination and time management as characteristic of ADHD and that he was constantly on the go, but often jumping from task to task.

Possible biomarkers for diagnosis
Reviews of ADHD biomarkers have noted that platelet monoamine oxidase expression, urinary norepinephrine, urinary MHPG, and urinary phenethylamine levels consistently differ between ADHD individuals and non-ADHD controls. These measurements could potentially serve as diagnostic biomarkers for ADHD, but more research is needed to establish their diagnostic utility. Urinary and blood plasma phenethylamine concentrations are lower in ADHD individuals relative to controls and the two most commonly prescribed drugs for ADHD, amphetamine and methylphenidate, increase phenethylamine biosynthesis in treatment-responsive individuals with ADHD. Lower urinary phenethylamine concentrations are also associated with symptoms of inattentiveness in ADHD individuals.

See also

References

Further reading

External links 

 National Institute of Mental Health. NIMH Pages About Attention-Deficit/Hyperactivity Disorder (ADHD). National Institutes of Health (NIH), U.S. Department of Health and Human Services. 
 New Zealand Ministry of Health Guidelines for the Assessment and Treatment of Attention-Deficit/Hyperactivity Disorder. 2 July 2001. 
 "Women and girls with ADHD" (video). (17 April 2020), with Stephen P. Hinshaw and others, Knowable Magazine .

 
1987 neologisms
Ailments of unknown cause
Amphetamine
Attention disorders
Learning disabilities
Methylphenidate
Wikipedia medicine articles ready to translate (full)
Wikipedia neurology articles ready to translate